The Las Hermosas National Natural Park is a national park located in the Valle del Cauca and Tolima departments, at the highest elevation of Cordillera Central range in the Andean Region of Colombia. Its main feature is probably the wetlands and 387 glacial lakes.

General
The park is bounded by the Magdalena River and Cauca River. The area has a canyon, formed by the surrounding rivers, but it is hard to access. It is of historical importance as it was one of the most defended areas by the indigenous Pijao peoples against the Spanish Conquistadors.

Three types of geological formations are found in the area: intrusive igneous rocks, metamorphic rock and formations from more recent volcanic eruptions.

Climate
Average yearly rainfall is 2000 mm at the lower elevations and 1500 mm above . Average temperature is 24 °C at the lower elevations, and 4 °C at the highest. December–March and July–August are dry periods.

Flora and fauna
Noteworthy plants include: wax palm trees, Podocarpus oleifolius, Aniba perutilis, Ocotea heterochroma, Chuquiraga jussieui, Passiflora tenerifensis and Andean Walnut.

The most diverse group of fauna are the birds, followed by the mammals and reptiles. Recorded mammals include: spectacled bear, mountain tapir, cougar, oncilla, pudú, white-tailed deer.
Fish in the glacial lakes feed on green algae, blue-green algae and
unicellular algae found throughout the 387 lakes.

Footnotes

References

National parks of Colombia
Protected areas established in 1977
Geography of Valle del Cauca Department
1977 establishments in Colombia
Tourist attractions in Valle del Cauca Department